Gaius Valerius Potitus Volusus was a consul in 410 and consular tribune in 415, 407 and 404 BC of the Roman Republic.

Valerius belonged to the Valeria gens, one of the oldest and possibly the most influential and powerful patrician gens of the early Republic.. The family had, according to legend, been among the first families to hold the consulship with Publius Valerius Poplicola as the first suffect consul in 509 BC. His father was named Lucius and depending on sources his grandfather was either named Volusus or Publius. If his grandfather was named Publius than Valerius contemporary, the multiple consular Lucius Valerius Potitus, should be considered as Valerius brother. Whoever Valerius father and grandfather they have not survived in our sources as holders of any offices. Valerius himself seems to have been the father of Gaius Valerius Potitus, the consular tribune in 370 BC.

Career 
Valerius first held the imperium in 415 BC as one of four consular tribunes. His colleagues in the office were Publius Cornelius Cossus, Numerius Fabius Vibulanus and Quintus Quinctius Cincinnatus, with the exception of Fabius all consulars were newcomers to the imperium. The actions of the consulars is little known but there was a proposal by the tribune of the plebs, Lucius Decius, to colonize Bolae which was vetoed by his own colleagues.

Valerius was a few years later, in 410 BC, elected to an ordinary consulship together with Manius Aemilius Mamercinus. There was a war against the Aequi and the Volsci. In response to this the consuls attempted a levy which was vetoed by the plebeian tribune Marcus Menenius, this and the resulting losses by the Romans, would turn the crowds and the other plebeian tribunes against Menenius resulting in his proposal of an agrarian law being denied. This drawback for the Romans was short-lived and the fortress of Arx Carventana was captured (or recaptured) by the Romans. One of the consuls, most likely Valerius, was granted an ovation for this victory.

Valerius was again elected as consular tribune in 407, this time sharing the office with Lucius Furius Medullinus, Gaius Servilius Ahala and his former colleague from 415 BC, Fabius. The whole college was exceptionally experienced and consisted solely of former consulars. War with the Aequi and Volsci was still a reality. The fortress of Arx Carventana which had been captured in 410 was lost by the following consuls in 409 while another town was captured, that of Verugo. The year after Verugo was captured, 408 BC, the Romans had been forced to elect a dictator. Although the college of 407 consisted of highly experienced and decorated commanders they could not hinder the successes of the Volscians, resulting in the loss of Verugo.

Valerius would hold his third and final consular tribuneship in 404 BC. His colleagues were Manius Sergius Fidenas, Publius Cornelius Maluginensis, Gnaeus Cornelius Cossus, Caeso Fabius Ambustus and Spurius Nautius Rutilus. War was continued with the Volsci and the Veii, with Artena being captured from the Volsci and the Siege of Veii, which had begun the previous year, was continued. Beside military actions there was also an expedition sent by the consulars which founded a new colony, Velitrae.

See also

References 

5th-century BC Roman consuls
Roman consular tribunes
Volusus, Gaius, Potitus